Jessica Lehnhoff (born 15 March 1980) is a Guatemalan born former professional tennis player from the United States.

Biography
Lehnhoff grew up in Guatemala City, the youngest in a family of four siblings, who moved to Florida when she was aged 11. She holds citizenship in 3 countries (Sweden, Guatemala & USA). Growing up in Guatemala, she attended the "Colegio Austriaco" (Austrian school), where she and her brothers all learned how to speak German. One of her brothers, Alexander, played Davis Cup for Guatemala. Their mother, Anne-Marie is Swedish and their father Guatemalan/German. Their father Walter died in 1999, while Lehnhoff was a freshman at the University of Florida .

A right-handed player, she was highly rated as a junior. Lehnhoff was the top ranked player in the country (USA) for her age group in 1995, the year she won a doubles title at the Orange Bowl. Lehnhoff also won the singles titles at the Eddie Herr International tournament as well as the Orange Bowl under 14's, making her the top 14 and under junior player in the world. She ended her junior tennis career having been ranked #1 in the US in the 14's, 16's and 18's divisions having won numerous national titles including hard court nationals, clay court nationals and indoor nationals.  She was also ranked top 10 ITF under 18's division, having won Grade A and Grade 1 international tournaments. After graduating from Cooper City High School and later on, American Heritage in Delray Beach, she played collegiate tennis for the University of Florida Gators. Partnering Whitney Laiho, she won the doubles title at the 2001 NCAA Division I Women's Tennis Championships after being undefeated all year. The pair subsequently were given a wildcard into the women's doubles at the 2001 US Open and reached the third round. That year, she and Laiho received the National doubles team of the year award. She captained the Gators in her senior year (having been ranked #1 in the nation in both singles and doubles in division 1 tennis) and graduated in 2002 with a degree in TV and Film production, after which she turned professional. During her senior year at UF, Lehnhoff won the All-American titles in both singles and doubles for only the third time in collegiate history.  She was an NCAA singles finalist that year.

As a professional, Lehnhoff reached a singles ranking of 166 in the world and won two ITF singles titles after only 2 years on tour. In 2004 she featured in the main draw of the French Open, Wimbledon Championships and US Open. At Wimbledon she partnered with Bethanie Mattek to reach the second round and as a result made it to her best doubles ranking of 105. She was a quarter-finalist in the doubles at the 2004 Challenge Bell, a WTA Tour tournament held in Quebec City. She won over 10 doubles titles in the pro circuit.

By 2007 she was retired from the tour, (after undergoing 2 right wrist surgeries) but began playing Fed Cup tennis for her native Guatemala. Over two years she appeared in a total of eight ties and finished with an 8/5 overall record.

Lehnhoff owns and runs Lehnhoff Tennis International, a college placement company, assisting junior tennis players from Sweden to be recruited by American colleges. She has also coached top Swedish junior players as well as ATP and WTA players. She was inducted into the UF athletic hall of fame in 2016, alongside basketball player David Lee and olympian swimmer Ryan Lochte.

ITF finals

Singles (2–0)

Doubles (10–5)

References

External links
 
 
 

1980 births
Living people
American female tennis players
Guatemalan female tennis players
Florida Gators women's tennis players
Sportspeople from Guatemala City
Guatemalan emigrants to the United States
Tennis people from Florida
Guatemalan people of German descent